Pop or POP may refer to:

Arts, Entertainment and Media 
 Pop music, a musical genre

Artists 
 POP, a Japanese idol group now known as Gang Parade
 Pop!, a UK pop group
 Pop! featuring Angie Hart, an Australian band

Albums 
 Pop (Gas album)
 Pop (Joachim Witt album)
 Pop (Mao Abe album)
 Pop (Same Difference album)
 Pop (Tones on Tail album)
 Pop (U2 album)
 Pop, an album by Topi Sorsakoski and Agents
 P.O.P, The Mad Capsule Markets album
 Pop! The First 20 Hits, an album by English duo Erasure

Songs 
 "Pop" (NSYNC song), a 2001 song
 "Pop!" (Nayeon song), a song from the album Im Nayeon
 "Pop", a song by A.R. Kane
 "Pop", a song by Ari Lennox from Shea Butter Baby
 "Pop", a song by La Oreja de Van Gogh from El viaje de Copperpot

Periodicals
 Pop (fashion magazine), a British publication
 Pop Magazine, a sports magazine

Television
 Pop (American TV channel), formerly  TVGN
 Pop (British and Irish TV channel), for children
 Pop (Slovenian TV channel), Slovenia
 Pop (Pakistani TV channel), for children
 Pop (Italy)

Toys
 POP! vinyl figurines from Funko
 Princess of Power, Mattel toys

Video games
 Prince of Persia, video game franchise
 Pop (video game)

Other uses in arts, entertainment, and media 
 PoP!, the fictional band in Music and Lyrics
 Pokémon Organized Play, trading cards

Commerce
 Pop, slang for pawning goods with a pawnbroker
 Pay on production
 Point of purchase, used often in retail
 Proof of concept
 Proof-of-payment, a fare collection approach

Organizations
 Eton Society, nickname
 Pencils of Promise, a charity
 Pop, a US company owned by Advance Publications Inc.

Places
 Gregorio Luperón International Airport (IATA code POP), Puerto Plata, Dominican Republic
 Pop, a tributary of the river Jijia in eastern Romania
 Pop, Uzbekistan, a town in Namangan Region, Uzbekistan
 Poppleton railway station (station code), York, England

People
 Pop (nickname)
 Pop (surname), a Romanian surname
 Pop Chalee (1906–1993), American painter, muralist, performer and singer born Merina Lujan
 Iggy Pop (born 1947), American musician
 Jimmy Pop (born 1972), American musician
 Pop Smoke (1999–2020), American rapper

Science and technology

Computing
 Operation removing element from a stack (abstract data type)
 Package on package, IC packaging
 Point of presence, a demarcation point between communicating entities
 POP and POP3, Internet e-mail Post Office Protocols
 Pop! OS, a Linux distribution.

Other uses in science and technology
 Pop (physics), sixth derivative of position
 Parallel Ocean Program, an ocean circulation model
 Paroxypropione, P.O.P.
 Persistent organic pollutant
 Probability of precipitation, in weather forecasting
 Progestogen-only pill, a contraceptive
 Pelvic organ prolapse, a gynecological condition
 Blind rivet
 Plaster of Paris, plaster of Gypsum 
 Pop, a recording noise from plosives, see pop filter

Sport 
 Pop (professional wrestling), a crowd cheer
 POP Championship (Princess of Pro-Wrestling), Japan

Other uses
 POP (Point of Purchase typeface), in Japanese Kanji
 Pop (ghost), in Thai folklore
 The first month of the Haabʼ in the Mayan calendar
 Pacific Ocean Park, an amusement park
 Problem-oriented policing
 Pop, a truncation of the word popular (as in pop culture)
 Pop, slang for soda
 Pop, an informal term for a father or occasionally a grandfather
 Pop., an abbreviation for population

See also 
 Popping (disambiguation)
 Pops (disambiguation)